Blackbird: The Music of Lennon and McCartney is a studio album by Australian singer songwriter Katie Noonan. The album was released in October 2008 and peaked at number 43 on the ARIA album chart. Blackbird is a set of cover versions of John Lennon and Paul McCartney tracks. The album includes performances from Ron Carter, Lewis Nash, Joe Lovano, John Scofield and Sam Keevers. At the ARIA Music Awards of 2009 the album won Best Jazz Album.

Background

In early 2005 Noonan heard Joe Lovano playing saxophone at Sydney's Angel Place. A couple of years later Noonan was dreaming up a project where she could combine her two main loves – pop music and the freedom of jazz improvisation. It was then that the seeds of the album were sewn. Noonan spoke to Lovano and flew to New York City to make a record with local jazz musicians.

Track listing

 "In My Life" - 4:25
 "Yesterday" - 5:14
 "For No One" - 3:07
 "Blackbird" - 3:04
 "If I Fell" - 4:15
 "Here, There and Everywhere" - 2:38
 "Norwegian Wood" - 3:31
 "Across the Universe" - 6:08
 "Eleanor Rigby" - 5:05
 "Michelle" - 3:58
 "Because" - 2:40
 "The Long and Winding Road" - 3:56
 "And I Love Her" - 4:06
 "Fool on the Hill" - 7:47
 "I Will" - 2:11

Charts

Weekly charts

Year-end charts

Release history

External links
 Blackbird - The Music of Lennon and McCartney at Discogs

References

Katie Noonan albums
2008 albums
ARIA Award-winning songs
Jazz albums by Australian artists
Sony Music Australia albums
Covers albums